Torretti is an Italian surname. Notable people with the surname include:

Giuseppe Torretti (1661–1743), Italian sculptor
Roberto Torretti (born 1930), Chilean author, philosopher, and academic
Talisa Torretti (born 2003), Italian rhythmic gymnast

Italian-language surnames